This is a list of ships built by William Denny and Brothers, Dumbarton, Scotland.

Ships

Footnotes

See also
Scottish Built Ships database

 Denny
William Denny and Brothers